Flavobacterium akiainvivens, or koohonua ili akia, (literally "ākia bark bacteria") is a species of gram-negative bacteria in the Flavobacteriaceae family.  The specific epithet akiainvivens is Latin and literally means "living on or in ākia."  It was isolated originally from decaying wood of the endemic Hawai'ian shrub ākia (Wikstroemia oahuensis).

Flavobacterium akiainvivens was discovered by Iris Kuo when she was just a high school student at Iolani School.  She and her coauthors determined that it shares a clade with Flavobacterium rivuli and Flavobacterium subsaxonicum.

Description
Grown on R2a agar, colonies are off-white or cream, around 2-3mm in diameter, mucoid and translucent.  Cells are gram-negative 0.4 by 2 µm rods.  The cells are without any gliding motility and the genome revealed no flagella or chemotaxis systems.  It is catalase-positive, oxidase-negative, and can not reduce nitrate.  The species expresses caseinase, lipase, and amylase, but can digest neither cellulose nor DNA.  It can grow both aerobically and microaerophilically but not anaerobically.  The primary carotenoid is zeaxanthin, but it does not have any flexirubin-type pigments.  The DNA G+C content for the type strain is 44.2 mol%.

State microbe status
In early 2013, state representative James Tokioka submitted HB 293 HD1 to establish F. akiainvivens as the state microbe of Hawaii.  At the time, no other U.S. states had a microorganism as a state symbol.  However, on 29 May 2013 Oregon officially designated Saccharomyces cerevisiae as the official microbe of the state, making it the first in the nation.  Meanwhile, the Hawaiian legislation was deferred for a year when it encountered competition from Senator Glenn Wakai's SB3124 proposing Aliivibrio fischeri.  In 2017, legislation similar to the original 2013 F. akiainvivens bill was submitted in the Hawaii House of Representatives by Isaac Choy and in the Hawaii Senate by Brian Taniguchi.

See also
List of Hawaii state symbols

References

External links

akiainvivens
Gram-negative bacteria
Bacteria described in 2013
Symbols of Hawaii